Attorney General Mathews may refer to:

David Mathews (died 1800), Attorney General of Nova Scotia
Henry M. Mathews (1830s–1884), Attorney General of West Virginia
Jeremy Fell Mathews (born 1941), Attorney General of Hong Kong
Robert F. Matthews Jr. (1923–2010), Attorney General of Kentucky

See also
General Mathews (disambiguation)